America's Prince: The John F. Kennedy Jr. Story is a 2003 20th Century Fox television film. It is a biographical film about John F. Kennedy Jr. and based on Christopher Andersen's 2000 bestseller, The Day John Died. It was directed by Eric Laneuville and stars Kristoffer Polaha, Portia de Rossi and Jacqueline Bisset in principal roles. It premiered on TBS on 12 January 2003.

Outline
The film outlines key moments of Kennedy's life, beginning with his fatal plane crash. Time is also devoted to his trying time at law school, his relationship with his iron-willed mother. The film also charts his romantic life, from his relationship with film actress Daryl Hannah to his marriage to Carolyn Bessette. It also charts his attempts to distance himself from the political Kennedy dynasty, instead devoting his efforts to a career as a magazine editor.

Cast
 Kristoffer Polaha as John F. Kennedy Jr.
 Portia de Rossi as Carolyn Bessette-Kennedy
 Jacqueline Bisset  as Jacqueline Bouvier Kennedy Onassis 
Tara Chocol as Daryl Hannah
Robert N. Smith as Michael Berman
 Kirsten Bishop as Caroline Kennedy Schlossberg
 Jennifer Baxter as Lauren Bessette
Tammy Isbell as Charley
 Colin Fox as Richard Lawton
 Michael Riley as Douglas Conte
George R. Robertson as Maurice Tempelsman
 Katie Griffin as Shrine Girl 1

See also
 Kennedy Curse

References

External links

2003 television films
2003 films
American television films
American biographical films
Films directed by Eric Laneuville
Films about the Kennedy family
Cultural depictions of John F. Kennedy
Cultural depictions of Jacqueline Kennedy Onassis
2000s English-language films
2000s American films